Maximum Security Prison is an inactive prison at Robben Island in Table Bay, 6.9 kilometers (4.3 mi) west of the coast of Bloubergstrand, Cape Town, South Africa. It is prominent because Nobel Laureate and former President of South Africa Nelson Mandela was imprisoned there for 18 of the 27 years he served behind bars before the fall of apartheid. After that, three former inmates of this prison Nelson Mandela, Kgalema Motlanthe, and Jacob Zuma have gone on to become President of South Africa.

It is a South African National Heritage Site as well as a UNESCO World Heritage Site.

History
Beginning in 1961, Maximum Security Prison was used by the South African government for political prisoners and convicted criminals.

The maximum security prison for political prisoners closed in 1991 and the medium security prison for criminal prisoners was closed five years later in 1996.

List of former prisoners

 Neville Alexander, proponent of a multilingual South Africa and former revolutionary
 Autshumato (probably around 1625 – 1665), one of the first activists against colonialism, and a Robben Island prisoner from 1658 to around 1660.
 Imam Abdallah ibn Qadi Abdus Salaam (also known as Tuan Guru), imprisoned from 1780 until 1793 for his anti-colonial activities against the Dutch.
 Dennis Brutus, former activist and poet
 Patrick Chamusso, former activist of the African National Congress
 Laloo Chiba, former accused at Little Rivonia Trial
 Ebrahim Ismail Ebrahim, South African anti-apartheid activist of Indian-origin and member of the ANC's armed wing Umkhonto We Sizwe. 
 Eddie Daniels, anti-apartheid activist
 Jerry Ekandjo, Namibian politician
 Nceba Faku, former Metro Mayor of Port Elizabeth
 Joe Gqabi, former ANC activist
 Harry Gwala, former ANC activist
 Nkwenkwe Nkomo, South African politician activist
 Petrus Iilonga, Namibian trade unionist, activist and politician
 Ahmed Kathrada, former Rivonia Trialist and long-serving prisoner
 Koesaaij, Malagasy co-leader of the Meermin slave mutiny in February, 1766
 Langalibalele, The King of the Hlubi people, one of the first activists against colonialism
 John Kenneth Malatji, former activist and special forces of ANC – Tladi, Soweto
 Njongonkulu Ndungane, later to become Archbishop of Cape Town
 Mosiuoa Lekota, imprisoned in 1974, President and Leader of the Congress of the People
 Mac Maharaj, former accused at Little Rivonia Trial
 Makana, one of the activists against colonialism
 Vusumzi Make, former PAC activist
 Clarence Makwetu, former PAC Activist
 Nelson Mandela, African National Congress leader and former president of South Africa (first black president)
 Gamzo Mandierd, activist
 Jeff Masemola, the first prisoner sentenced to life imprisonment in the apartheid era
 Amos Masondo, former Mayor of Johannesburg
 Massavana, Malagasy leader of the Meermin slave mutiny in February, 1766
 Michael Matsobane, leader of Young African Religious Movement. Sentenced at Bethal in 1979; released by PW Botha in 1987.
 Chief Maqoma, former chief who died on the island in 1873
 Govan Mbeki, father of former president of South Africa Thabo Mbeki. Govan was sentenced to life in 1963 but was released from Robben Island in 1987 by PW Botha
 Wilton Mkwayi, former accused at Little Rivonia Trial
 Andrew Mlangeni, former Rivonia Trialist
 Johnson Mlambo, former PAC activist
 Murphy Morobe, Soweto Uprising student leader
 Dikgang Moseneke, Deputy Chief Justice of South Africa
 Zephania Mothopeng, former PAC activist
 Elias Motsoaledi, former Rivonia Trialist
 Sayed Abdurahman Moturu, the Prince of Madura, one of Cape Town's first imams, who was exiled to the island in 1740 and died there in 1754
 Griffiths Mxenge, a South African Lawyer and member of the African National Congress
 Billy Nair, former Rivonia Trialist and ANC/SACP leader
 M. D. Naidoo, a South African lawyer and member of the African National Congress
 John ya Otto Nankudhu, Namibian liberation fighter
 John Nkosi Serving life but released by PW Botha in 1987
 Samuel Sisulu Founder of South African Freedom Organisation
 Nongqawuse, the Xhosa prophetess responsible for the Cattle Killing
 Maqana Nxele, former Xhosa prophet who drowned while trying to escape
 John Nyathi Pokela, co-founder and former chairman of the PAC
 Joe Seremane, former chairperson of the Democratic Alliance.
 Tokyo Sexwale, businessman and aspirant leader of the African National Congress
 Gaus Shikomba, Namibian politician
 Walter Sisulu, former ANC Activist
Raymond Mhlaba, former ANC Activist and first former Premier of the Eastern Cape.
 Stone Sizani, ANC Chief Whip
 Robert Sobukwe, former leader of the PAC
 Seth Mazibuko, youngest member of the South African Students' Organisation that planned and led the Soweto uprising
 Steve Tshwete, former ANC Activist
 Moses Twebe, former ANC Activist
 Andimba Toivo ya Toivo, Namibian politician
 Sakaria Nashandi, Namibian politician
 Jacob Zuma, former president of South Africa and leader of the African National Congress
 Achmad Cassiem, former leader of the Pan-Africanist Congress (PAC) and leader of the Qibla movement
 Setsiba Paul Mohohlo, former APLA unit commander
 Micheal Ludumo Buka, former ANC Activist
 Kgalema Motlanthe, Former deputy president of the African National Congress and South Africa's third president since the dawn of democracy
 John Aifheli Thabo, an ANC political activist 
 Ezra Mvuyisi Sigwela, an ANC political activist
 Xolani Casper Jonas, an ANC political activist
 Kwezi Nontsikelo, ANC political activist, Advisor to the Minister of Defence
 Kisten Moonsamy, former Rivonia Trialist
 Dimitri Tsafendas, Greek-Mozambican lifelong political militant and the assassin of Prime Minister of South Africa Hendrik Verwoerd
 Stephen Dlamini, ANC activist
 Peter Mokaba, former ANC Activist
 Vejaynand Ramlakan, former ANC Activist

Gallery

References

External links

 Robben Island Museum
 Robben Island – UNESCO World Heritage Centre
 Robben Island Museum at Google Cultural Institute

 
Defunct prisons in South Africa
Apartheid museums
History museums in South Africa
Museums in Cape Town